This is a list of concert appearances, at multi-artist events and in solo shows, by Swedish singer Loreen. She went on tour starting in 2012 to promote her first studio album Heal.

Her concert appearances have included shows that were part of "Art on Ice" in 2014, as well as a solo concert tour called "Tour XIV", also in 2014.

Set list 

As Loreen appears in talents shows and festivals, she is seen playing several songs from her debut album Heal, including:
 "In My Head"
 "My Heart Is Refusing Me"
 "Euphoria"
 "Euphoria" (acoustic guitar version)
 "Crying Out Your Name" 
 "Sober"
 "If She's the One" 
 "Breaking Robot"
 "See You Again"
 "Heal" (feat. Blanks)
 "We Got the Power"
 "Dumpster"
 "Jupiter Drive"

Tour dates 

Cancellations and rescheduled shows

References 

Lists of concert tours